Kondaparthy is an ancient village in Hanamkonda district, which is located 12 km from Warangal city in Telangana.

Konda which means hill and parthy means living place in the local language Telugu which is one of the Dravidian languages. The village is surrounded by three hills, hence it is called as Kondaparthy.  Historically this village is ruled by Kakatiya Dynasty which is one of the strongest dynasties in medieval south India.

Three inscriptions found at Kondaparthy describe:

1) the place's existence since the period of 9th century A.D. and was known as Sri Kondiparthy Nagara.

2) The construction of a tank called Chaunda Samudram by the general of Kakatiya King Ganapathideva called Chaunda Senani in 11th century A.D.

3) The construction of Rudreswara and Kesava temples, and also adding prakara to both temples along with the Proleswara Siva Temple which was already here before the Kakatiya period.

The ruined Shiva temple at Kondaparthy has intricate sculptures and reliefs indicating the architectural and sculptural finesse of the time and also an example of Kakatiya denoting the major events of their reign through sculptures.

References 

Villages in Hanamkonda district